Marshel Arthur (1879–1962) was a china clay worker and historian from Cornwall, UK.

After the death of his father Marshel left school at the age of ten in 1889 and began work as a tool boy under his older brother Tom, at Lower Goonamaris China Stone Quarry in January 1890. He recalled his experiences in his autobiography (completed in 1955): Autobiography of a China Clay Worker: with a Short History of the Rise of the China Clay Industry, St Austell: Federation of Old Cornwall Societies, (1995)

References

Hudson, Kenneth The History of English China Clays: Fifty Years of Pioneering and Growth ; pp. 31–33 & 151-153

1879 births
1962 deaths
Writers from Cornwall
People from St Austell